Butterfly is the seventh UK studio album by British band the Hollies, released in November 1967. It was the final Hollies album to feature Graham Nash before his departure from the group in 1968. The album consisted solely of songs written by the trio of Nash, Allan Clarke, and Tony Hicks, with Nash leading the sessions. It showcased the band's pop-oriented approach to psychedelia.

In the US and Canada, Epic Records released an alternate version of the album as Dear Eloise / King Midas in Reverse (also November 1967), featuring a different track selection/order and alternate artwork. The 1967 single "King Midas in Reverse" was not included on the UK of the album, but was added to the North American version.

UK Release
As with Evolution (1967), none of the songs on the UK album were selected for single or EP release in the UK. The mono single and stereo CD versions of "Try It" differ greatly in terms of sound effects and vocals.  Cash Box said of "Dear Eloise" that it has "pounding orchestrations and a tremendous vocal sound added to the exotic beginning-finish."

In 1978, Parlophone reissued Butterfly with new cover art, and again in 1999. Almost all current CD issues of this album contain the original cover art.

Track listing

Dear Eloise / King Midas in Reverse 

The North American version of Butterfly was retitled Dear Eloise / King Midas in Reverse, given a different full-color cover featuring a picture of the group, and released on Epic Records on 27 November 1967. The US and Canadian versions both included the single "King Midas in Reverse" and the UK Evolution track "Leave Me", while deleting the UK Butterfly songs "Pegasus", "Try It" and "Elevated Observations".

Release
In the US, "Dear Eloise" was issued as a single A-side while "Try It" and "Elevated Observations?" were issued as B-sides of the "Jennifer Eccles" and "Do the Best You Can" singles, respectively. In Canada, the single "Dear Eloise" reached No. 36. 

Billboard praised the titular singles and added that "the other nine cuts don’t disappoint," summarizing the album as a "wealth of good material, well-handled."

The 1998 US CD reissue of Dear Eloise/King Midas in Reverse by Sundazed presents the original UK Butterfly track line-up with "King Midas in Reverse", "Leave Me" and "Do The Best You Can" added to the track listing.

Track listing

Personnel
Allan Clarke – vocals, harmonica
Tony Hicks – lead guitar, vocals, electric sitar on “Maker”
Graham Nash – rhythm guitar, vocals, harmonium on “Dear Eloise”
Bobby Elliott – drums
Bernie Calvert – bass, keyboards
John Scott – string and brass arrangements

References 

1967 albums
The Hollies albums
Parlophone albums
Albums produced by Ron Richards (producer)